Cobitis strumicae is a species of ray-finned fish in the family Cobitidae.
It is found in Bulgaria and Greece.

Sources

Cobitis
Freshwater fish of Europe
Fish described in 1955
Taxa named by Stanko Karaman
Taxonomy articles created by Polbot